Wild Knoll is the peak rising to 1773 m in the central portion of Bastien Range in Ellsworth Mountains, Antarctica.  The feature has steep and partly ice-free west slopes, and surmounts upper Minnesota Glacier to the south-southwest.

The peak is named after the Swiss natural history illustrator John James (Jean Jacques) Wild (1824-1900), a member of the British 1872-76 Challenger Expedition who took the first photographs in the Antarctic region in 1874.

Location
US mapping in 1961 and 1988.

Maps
 Vinson Massif.  Scale 1:250 000 topographic map.  Reston, Virginia: US Geological Survey, 1988.
 Antarctic Digital Database (ADD). Scale 1:250000 topographic map of Antarctica. Scientific Committee on Antarctic Research (SCAR). Since 1993, regularly updated.

Notes

References
 Wild Knoll. SCAR Composite Gazetteer of Antarctica.
 Bulgarian Antarctic Gazetteer. Antarctic Place-names Commission. (details in Bulgarian, basic data in English)

External links
 Wild Knoll. Copernix satellite image

Ellsworth Mountains
Bulgaria and the Antarctic
Mountains of Ellsworth Land